Sergei Bubka won in the final 7–6(6), 6–4, against Takao Suzuki.

Seeds

Draw

Final four

Top half

Bottom half

References
Main Draw
Qualifying Draw

Shimadzu All Japan Indoor Tennis Championships
2009 Singles